Boletus poikilochromus is a species of bolete native to southern (Mediterranean) Europe and Israel.

References

poikilochromus
Fungi of Europe
Fungi described in 1987